Cloghanboy (Cooke) is a townland in Athlone, County Westmeath, Ireland. The townland is in the civil parish of St. Mary's.

The townland is located in the north of the town, with its southern border being the M6 motorway. Cloghanboy (Homan) borders the townland to the west, and Cloghanboy (Strain) is to the south.

References 

Townlands of County Westmeath